Drymus is a genus of dirt-colored seed bugs in the family Rhyparochromidae. There are at least 4 described species in Drymus.

Species
 Drymus brunneus (Sahlberg, 1848)
 Drymus crassus Van Duzee, 1910
 Drymus pilipes Fieber, 1861
 Drymus unus (Say, 1832)

References

 Thomas J. Henry, Richard C. Froeschner. (1988). Catalog of the Heteroptera, True Bugs of Canada and the Continental United States. Brill Academic Publishers.

Further reading

External links

 NCBI Taxonomy Browser, Drymus

Drymini